Rhytiphora albocincta is a species of beetle in the family Cerambycidae. It was described by Félix Édouard Guérin-Méneville in 1831, originally under the genus Saperda. It is known from Australia. It feeds on Acacia pubescens and Acacia longifolia. It contains the variety Rhytiphora albocincta var. compos.

References

albocincta
Beetles described in 1831